Parameswaravarman I was a Pallava emperor who ruled in South India in the latter half of the 7th century, 670-695 AD. He ascended to the throne after the death of his father Mahendravarman II in 670 CE.  His grandfather Narasimhavarman I had already made the Pallava empire the most powerful force in the subcontinent and destroyed the Chalukya capital at Vatapi. Parameswaravarman was an efficient and capable ruler, known for his military exploits, his love for poetry and his devotion to Siva, to whom he erected many temples.

Parameswaravarman's reign was marked by revived conflicts with the Chalukya, led by Vikramaditya I who had fought against his grandfather and was now allied with many rulers . In 674 CE the two armies met at Peruvalanallur near Tiruchirappalli and Parameswaravarman was victorious stupendously despite facing a huge coalition.

He was succeeded by his son Narasimhavarman II also called Rajasimha in 695 CE.

References

 South Indian inscriptions volume 1, volume 13 published by ASI
 Periya puranam, a hagiography of Saiva saints, by Sekkizhaar of the 12th century CE
 Rayakota grant of Parameswara varman 1

Pallava kings
7th-century births
7th-century deaths